The terms street football and street soccer (American and Canadian English) encompass a number of informal varieties of association football. These informal pick up games do not necessarily follow the requirements of a formal game of football, such as a large field, field markings, goal apparatus and corner flags, eleven players per team, or match officials (referee and assistant referees). Many renowned professional players have learned to play football on the street, including the likes of Diego Maradona, Johan Cruyff, Pelé, Giuseppe Meazza, Éamon Dunphy, Eusebio, Dejan Savićević, and Cristiano Ronaldo, among others.

Background 

Street football is more similar to beach football and futsal than to association football. Often the most basic of set-ups will involve just a ball with a wall or fence used as a goal, or items such as clothing being used for goalposts (hence the phrase "jumpers for goalposts"). The phrase was used by Ed Sheeran in his 2015 documentary Jumpers for Goalposts: Live at Wembley Stadium as a nod to playing the concerts at Wembley Stadium, the "home of football."

In some cases, a standard ball is not available and street football depends on a ball made out of garbage, such as discarded plastic. Handwalla Bwana, describing street football in the Kakuma refugee camp said "We used to make a garbage ball. We used to go through the garbage cans and make as much soccer ball as we could" and attributed use of the garbage ball to being better with his feet. Johan Cruyff has said "Footballers from the street are more important than trained coaches."

The ease of playing these informal games on the streets and open spaces make football the most popular sport in the world.

Street football is particularly popular in the United Kingdom, where games such as Headers and Volleys and Wembley Singles are popular throughout.

Video games 

In 2005, video game publisher Electronic Arts introduced FIFA Street, a franchise based on street football and freestyle football. FIFA Street series focuses on flair, style and trickery, reflecting the cultures of street football and freestyle football played in streets and backlots across the world.

In 2019, Electronic Arts added a Volta gameplay mode to FIFA 20. It shares similarities to the FIFA Street series and has a storyline of a street football player playing through the ranks, both making new friends and losing old ones along the way.

See also 
Streetball
Homeless World Cup

References 

 
Football
Association football variants